The lowland brush mouse (Pogonomelomys bruijni) is a species of rodent in the family Muridae. It is found in Indonesia on the island of Salawati and on the Vogelkop Peninsula in Papua Province, Indonesia.

Taxonomy 

The grey pogonomelomys (Pogonomelomys brassi) was formely included under this species.

Ecology
The lowland brush mouse is an arboreal rodent and lives in holes in trees.

Status
The tropical humid forests in which this mouse lives are increasingly being cleared to make way for agriculture and this must be affecting the species. Previously classified as "critically endangered", the lowland brush mouse has been found to be more plentiful than was once thought and has been reclassified as "near threatened".

References

Pogonomelomys
Mammals described in 1876
Taxa named by Wilhelm Peters
Taxonomy articles created by Polbot
Taxobox binomials not recognized by IUCN
Taxa named by Giacomo Doria